These are the RPM magazine Dance number one hits of 1978.

Number ones of 1978

See also
List of RPM number-one dance singles chart (Canada)

References

External links
 Read about RPM Magazine at the AV Trust
 Search RPM charts here at Library and Archives Canada

1978 in Canadian music
Canada Dance
Dance
RPM electronic dance music chart
Dance music